The Bowling Green Falcons men's basketball team is the basketball team that represent Bowling Green State University in Bowling Green, Ohio. The school's team currently competes in the Mid-American Conference. The team last played in the NCAA Division I men's basketball tournament in 1968. The Falcons head coaching position is vacant as Michael Huger was fired after the 2023 season.

Coaching history 

Bowling Green was a member of the Northwest Ohio Intercollegiate Athletic Association from at least 1927–28 through at least 1930–31. Information about their conference record is unavailable.
Bowling Green was a member of the Ohio Athletic Conference from the 1933–34 through 1941–42 seasons, but never won an OAC title.
Bowling Green joined the Mid-American Conference beginning with the 1953–54 season.
The Mid-American Conference did not hold a conference tournament until the 1979–80 season.

Postseason

NCAA Tournament Results

The Falcons have appeared in four NCAA Tournaments. Their combined record is 1–5. Their drought of 55 years (as of ) is tied for the fourth-longest between tournament appearances.

NIT Results
The Falcons have appeared in 14 National Invitation Tournaments. Their combined record is 6–15.

CIT Results
The Falcons have appeared in two CollegeInsider.com Postseason Tournament. Their combined record is 1–2.

CBI results
The Falcons have appeared in one College Basketball Invitational (CBI). Their record is 0–1.

CCAT Results
The Falcons appeared in one Collegiate Commissioners Association Tournament, a tournament that was only held twice. Their record is 1–1.

Falcons in the NBA

References

External links
 
 Players who attended BGSU

 
1915 establishments in Ohio